The RIT Tigers ice hockey program consists of two ice hockey teams that represent Rochester Institute of Technology:

RIT Tigers men's ice hockey
RIT Tigers women's ice hockey